Khosrow   is a male given name of Iranian origin, most notably held by Khosrow I of Sassanid Persia, but also by other people in various locations and languages. In some times and places, the word has come to mean "king" or "ruler", and in some cases has been used as a dynastic name.

Khosrow is the Modern Persian variant. The word ultimately comes from Proto-Iranian *Hu-sravah ("with good reputation"), itself ultimately from Proto-Indo-European *h₁su- ("good") + *ḱléwos ("fame").

This is the oldest attestation.

The name was used by various rulers of Parthian Empire. It has been attested in Parthian-language inscriptions as "hwsrw", which may be variously transcribed and pronounced. The Old Armenian form was Khosrov, derived from Parthian, and was held by several rulers of the Arsacid dynasty of Armenia. The name is still used in modern Armenian.

Notable as to the use of Khosrow as a title is the father of Mirian III of Iberia who was known as k'asre (Old Georgian). This led to confusion, as some historians thought that Mirian III must therefore be the son of a Sasanian ruler, and not a Parthian one.

The name was notably used by several rulers of Sassanian Empire. In their native language, Middle Persian, the name has been spelt variously as hwslwb, hwslwb', hwsrwb, hwslwd, and hwsrwd' in Pahlavi scripts. The Middle Persian word also means "famous" or "of good repute".

The word was borrowed into Arabic as Kisrā or Kasrā, a variant which come to be used in New Persian as well. In Islamic Persia, kisrā became a strong byword for tyrannical pagan kingship, and is used as a general shorthand for Sassanian rulers (hence also "Taq-e Kasra", literally "Arc of Kasra"), as pharaoh is used for pre-Islamic Egyptian rulers.

See also
 Khosrow (disambiguation)

References

Persian words and phrases
Persian masculine given names
Armenian masculine given names
Azerbaijani masculine given names
Royal titles
Noble titles
Titles of national or ethnic leadership